Sofia Mystrioti (born 17 February 1975) is a Greek alpine skier. She competed in the women's giant slalom at the 1998 Winter Olympics.

References

1975 births
Living people
Greek female alpine skiers
Olympic alpine skiers of Greece
Alpine skiers at the 1998 Winter Olympics
Place of birth missing (living people)